Mill Creek Township is a township in Bourbon County, Kansas, USA.  As of the 2000 census, its population was 472.

Geography
According to the USGS, it contains two cemeteries: Centerville and West Plains.

The streams of Honey Creek and Little Mill Creek run through this township.

Further reading

References

 USGS Geographic Names Information System (GNIS)

External links
 City-Data.com
 Bourbon County Maps: Current, Historic Collection

Townships in Bourbon County, Kansas
Townships in Kansas